The Volkswagen Passat (B6 & B7) is a front-engine D-segment large family car manufactured and marketed by Volkswagen from 2005 to 2010 (B6) and from 2010 to 2015 (B7, facelift). Respectively the six and seventh generation Passat, and internally designated B6 and B7, they were marketed in sedan and wagon bodystyles in front-wheel as well as all-wheel drive configurations, with a range of petrol and diesel engines.

The B6 debuted at the Geneva Motor Show in March 2005, and launched in Europe in the summer of 2005, using a long-wheelbase version of the fifth-generation Golf and Jetta, along with a transverse engine layout. B6 Passats were marketed globally, and superseded in North America by a model exclusively manufactured at Volkswagen's Chattanooga Assembly Plant. VW debuted the B7 facelift at the Paris Motor Show in September 2010 and continued to market B7 models globally outside North America.

Notable variations included the Passat CC, a sedan variant with revised styling, along with the R36 variant, featuring the VR6 engine. The all-wheel drive version, marketed as 4motion, uses a Haldex Traction multi-plate clutch. A B7 all wheel drive wagon was marketed as the Alltrack and sedan and wagons were also marketed in China.

Notable variations

Passat R36 
At the Frankfurt Motor Show in September 2007, Volkswagen launched the 'R line' R36, created by Volkswagen Individual GmbH.

The name "R36" is derived from the engine displacement, 3.6-litres.

The R36 features redesigned front and rear spoilers, 4 wheel drive, DSG gearbox with paddleshift on the flat-bottom steering wheel, 18" Omanyt aluminium alloy wheels,  lowered  suspension, 'R' engraved stainless steel pedals, Recaro seats with R36 logo, heated front and rear seats, Bi-Xenon headlights with cornering function, and twin rear muffler tailpipes.

In July 2008, Volkswagen launched the R36 version in the Middle East.

Passat CC 

The CC ("Comfort Coupé") is a 4-door "coupé" version of the Passat. It debuted at the 2008 North American International Auto Show in Detroit. Originally aimed at competing with the similarly styled Mercedes CLS, the Passat CC intends to be more stylish and luxurious than the previously released Passat B6. In the U.S., the name "Passat" was dropped, and the car is being sold as "CC". Some options specific to the CC include hands-free parking, lane-departure prevention, intelligent cruise control, and adaptive suspension. Engines offered in the CC mirror those of the regular Passat, with options of the base 2.0-liter turbocharged four-cylinder, or the optional 3.6-liter V-6, which includes 4-motion all wheel drive. Although the CC is marketed as a more luxurious Passat B6, it comes in with a lower price tag. While the MSRP of a Passat B6 is $29,300, the CC comes with a base price of $27,100.

The Chinese-made CC was released by FAW-VW on July 15, 2010. Two engine options are provided: 1.8T and 2.0T.

Passat Alltrack 
In October 2010, the Passat Alltrack debuted at the 2010 Tokyo Motor Show, straddling the company's passenger and UV ranges.

The Passat Alltrack has raised ground clearance from 135 to 165 mm which improves approach angle from 13.5 to 16 degrees, departure angle from 11.9 to 13.6 degrees and ramp angle from 9.5 to 12.8 degrees when compared to the standard Passat wagon.
Passat Alltrack is the only VW in the passenger range to offer 4Motion with off-road driving programme, the off-road system works in conjunction with the ABS, electronic differential lock (EDL), DSG & hill descent assist system to control the vehicle in an off-road expedition.

The engine range of the Passat Alltrack consists of two 2.0 L TDI with outputs of 103 kW/140 hp & 125 kW/170 hp and two petrol engines, 1.8 L producing 118 kW/160 hp and 2.0 L TSI producing 155 kW/207 hp. The TDI models come standard with BlueMotion Technology packages with Stop/Start system and battery regeneration mode for recovering braking energy. The two lesser powered engine variants 2.0 L TDI and 1.8 L TSI are only available in front wheel drive format with a manual 6 speed transmission. The rest of the range with 4Motion has a 6 speed DSG automated manual transmission, except the 2.0 L TDI with 103 kW/140 hp has an option of 6 speed manual.

In 2012 at the New York Auto Show, VW showed a Passat Alltrack with 2.0 L TDI 125 kW/170 hp under Alltrack Concept nameplate to gauge response for a future market in the offroad wagon segment.

2010 facelift (B7) 

The B6 Passat was facelifted by Klaus Bischoff and Walter de Silva, and was unveiled at the Paris Motor Show in September 2010 for the 2011 model year. The B7 facelift revised all external body panels (except roof and glasshouse) and revised grille and headlights. Overall height and width dimensions remained unchanged, while length increased by 4 mm. New features included a fatigue detection system and an automatic "city emergency braking" system. It arrived at dealerships in December 2010. Interiors featured minor detail changes.

China 
In China, the PQ46 Passat was released by FAW-Volkswagen (Volkswagen Group China subsidiary FAW-Volkswagen (FAW-VW) as the Magotan since July 2007, after Volkswagen's other joint venture in China, Shanghai Volkswagen Automotive (SVW), had decided to use the B5 platform for the Passat and the Passat Lingyu (long-wheelbase Passat). Since August 2010 the wagon version of Passat B6 will be offered in China, which is a fully imported model. But this car is simply called Volkswagen Variant in China, in order not to refer the name "Passat" or "Magotan".

Malaysia 
On December 21, 2010 an agreement to assemble Volkswagen vehicles in Malaysia was signed between DRB-Hicom and Volkswagen AG, which followed the MOU signed by both parties in August of that year aimed at investigating the possibility of local vehicle production. The first locally assembled VW model to be rolled out from DRB-Hicom's Pekan plant in Pahang state, Malaysia, was the Volkswagen Passat in 2012.

Engines 

In the U.S. market, a  2.0-litre turbocharged I4 was offered along with the  3.6-litre VR6 engine, with six-speed manual (only available on the base 2.0 T model) and automatic transmissions. As of the 2009 model year, the VR6 engine and 4motion option were discontinued on US Passats.

In February 2008, the 2.0 FSI was replaced with the new Audi-developed 1.8 TSI engine and 6-speed automatic transmission. This engine is part of the wider Volkswagen Group policy for engine sharing.

As at August 2008, the cars were advertised in the UK as Euro 4 emission class.  By July 2009, this had changed to Euro 5 class.  This coincides with the introduction of the EA189 engine family at the centre of the VW emissions violation situation that became public in September 2015.

The Passat B7 range features several petrol and diesel engines, all to Euro 5 standards. All diesel engines feature BlueMotion Technology and Diesel Particulate Filter as standard.
The BlueTDI engine is fitted with a Selective Catalytic Reduction system which makes it ready for Euro 6 standards.

Passat Estate TSI EcoFuel concept (2008) 
It is a concept vehicle capable of using natural gas or conventional petrol fuel. It includes a 1.4-litre TSI 150 PS engine featuring both a supercharger and a turbocharger operating sequentially, 22 kg capacity natural gas tank mounted beneath the boot floor and 31-litre petrol tank.

The vehicle was unveiled in the 2008 Geneva Motor Show.

Production version went on sale at the end of 2008 in mainland Europe, for saloon and estate versions of the Passat.

Awards 
The Passat Estate won the overall winner of Practical Caravans Towcar of the Year Awards 2008 for its array of towing features such as its Trailer Stability Programme.

References 

Passat B6
Sedans
Cars introduced in 2005
Euro NCAP large family cars
2010s cars
All-wheel-drive vehicles
Cars powered by VR engines
Mid-size cars
Station wagons

simple:Volkswagen Passat#Passat Mk6